Jason Lyon Boesel (born 1977/1978) is an American musician, songwriter and producer based in Los Angeles. He was the drummer for Rilo Kiley and has also played with The Elected and Conor Oberst and the Mystic Valley Band.

Bands

He also drummed in the Bright Eyes touring band during their 2005 tour, and went on to write the liner notes for the consequent Bright Eyes live album, Motion Sickness and contributing to Bright Eyes' 2007 record, Cassadaga. From December 2007, he has played with Bright Eyes' Conor Oberst in Conor Oberst and the Mystic Valley Band, with whom Bosel wrote and sings lead for 2 tracks on their 2009 album Outer South.

On January 12, 2010, Boesel released his debut solo album 'Hustler's Son' via Team Love.

See
Evergreen
Ben Lee
Dawes
Bright Eyes
The Elected
Jenny Lewis with the Watson Twins
Johnathan Rice
The Lassie Foundation
Rilo Kiley
Conor Oberst and the Mystic Valley Band
JJAMZ
Our Lady Peace (appears on "Won't Turn Back" single)
Phases

Album Appearances
Bright Eyes - Lua (Single) (2004 · Saddle Creek)
Bright Eyes - Take It Easy (Love Nothing) (2004 · Saddle Creek)
Bright Eyes - I'm Wide Awake, It's Morning (2005 · Saddle Creek)
Bright Eyes - Digital Ash in a Digital urn (2005 · Saddle Creek)
Bright Eyes - Motion Sickness (2006 · Team Love)
Bright Eyes - Four Winds (2007 · Saddle Creek)
Bright Eyes - Cassadaga (2007 · Saddle Creek)
Conor Oberst and the Mystic Valley Band -  Conor Oberst (2008 · Merge Records)
Jakob Dylan - Seeing Things (2008 · Capitol)
Conor Oberst and the Mystic Valley Band -  Outer South (2009 · Merge Records)
The Young Veins - Take A Vacation! (2010 · One Haven Music)
Jenny & Johnny - I'm Having Fun Now (2010 - Warner Bros.)
The Elected - Bury Me in My Rings (2011 - Vagrant Records)
Conor Oberst - Upside Down Mountain (2014 - Nonesuch)
Springtime Carnivore - Midnight Room (2016 - Autumn Tone Records)
Ryan Adams - Prisoner (2017 - PaxAm)

References

External links
Rilo Kiley official website
Saddle Creek Records
Jason Boesel collection at the Internet Archive's live music archive

1970s births
Date of birth missing (living people)
Place of birth missing (living people)
Rilo Kiley members
American rock drummers
Living people
Saddle Creek Records artists
American indie rock musicians
Conor Oberst and the Mystic Valley Band members
The Elected members
21st-century American drummers
Phases (band) members